

This is a list of properties on the National Register of Historic Places in Hampshire County, Massachusetts.

This is intended to be a complete list of the properties and districts on the National Register of Historic Places in Hampshire County, Massachusetts, United States. Latitude and longitude coordinates are provided for many National Register properties and districts; these locations may be seen together in a map.

There are 83 properties and districts listed on the National Register in the county, including 3 National Historic Landmarks.

Current listings

|}

See also
 
 List of National Historic Landmarks in Massachusetts
 National Register of Historic Places listings in Massachusetts

References

 
 
Hampshire County
Buildings and structures in Hampshire County, Massachusetts
Hampshire County, Massachusetts